The Michaud River is a river in Sudbury District in Northeastern Ontario, Canada. It is in the Great Lakes Basin and is a left tributary of the Onaping River.

Course
The creek begins at Little Michaud Lake in geographic Tyrone Township, and flows north to Michaud Lake. It exits the lake at the northwest and flows northwest to Shkowona Lake, then heads west, passes into geographic Leinster Township, and reaches its mouth at the Onaping River. The Onaping River flows via the Vermilion River and the Spanish River to Lake Huron.

Tributaries
Both enter at Shkowona Lake.
Venetian Creek (right)
Sandcherry Creek (left)

See also
List of rivers of Ontario

References

Sources

Rivers of Sudbury District